The Speed of Darkness is a play written by Steve Tesich.

Productions
The play received its world premiere at the Goodman Theatre in Chicago, with Bill Raymond as Joe, Stephen Lang as Lou, and Lee Guthrie as Anne.

It made its Broadway premiere two years later at the Belasco Theatre on February 28, 1991, where it ran for 36 performances. Stephen Lang reprised his role as Lou, appearing along with Len Cariou as Joe, Lisa Eichhorn as Joe's wife Anne, Kathryn Erbe as Joe's daughter Mary, and Robert Sean Leonard as Mary's friend Eddie. Both Lang and Erbe received Tony Award nominations as Best Featured Actor and Actress (respectively) in a Play.

External links
 
"The Speed of Darkness and 'Crazed Vets on the Doorstep'" by David J. DeRose, Theater Studies, Yale University, examining the play and the history of previous plays on the same theme.
 Review of the world premiere production from the Chicago Reader by Lawrence Bommer; May 4, 1989.
 Review of the world premiere production from The New York Times by Frank Rich; May 9, 1989
 Review of the Broadway premiere from The New York Times by Frank Rich, March 1, 1991

1989 plays
Broadway plays
Plays by Steve Tesich
Plays set in South Dakota
Vietnam War fiction